The following is a list of the 17 cantons of the Lot department, in France, following the French canton reorganisation which came into effect in March 2015:

 Cahors-1
 Cahors-2
 Cahors-3
 Causse et Bouriane
 Causse et Vallées
 Cère et Ségala
 Figeac-1
 Figeac-2
 Gourdon
 Gramat
 Lacapelle-Marival
 Luzech
 Marches du Sud-Quercy
 Martel
 Puy-l'Évêque
 Saint-Céré
 Souillac

References